The Sing Tao Daily (also known as Sing Tao Jih Pao) is Hong Kong's oldest and second-largest Chinese language newspaper. It is owned by Sing Tao News Corporation, of which Kwok Ying-shing is chairman. Its English language sister paper is The Standard.

Sing Tao's Toronto edition is partly owned by Star Media Group, the publisher of the Toronto Star, a Torstar Corporation company.

History 

Sing Tao Daily is the oldest Chinese language daily newspaper in Hong Kong, having commenced publication on 1 August 1938.

The first overseas edition of the paper was launched in 1963 in San Francisco, where the group’s first overseas office was set up in May 1964.

In 1992, Sing Tao Daily, encountering financial difficulties, established a joint publication with the International Culture Publishing Corporation, a front organization for the Ministry of State Security. 

Until 2002, the parent company of Sing Tao Daily was Sing Tao Holdings; since then it has been Sing Tao News Corporation.

In 2021, Sing Tao's U.S.-based subsidiaries registered with the United States Department of Justice as foreign agents under the Foreign Agents Registration Act.

Political stance 
The Sing Tao has a long pro-government history. Before the handover of Hong Kong to China, it supported the Kuomintang and British Hong Kong government; and once Hong Kong was transferred and turned into a special administrative region, the paper turned its support to the Beijing government.

Charles Ho, chairman of Sing Tao News Corp Ltd. until June 2021, and his predecessor Sally Aw, were both members of the Chinese People’s Political Consultative Conference, a select group of the Chinese Communist Party’s loyal friends and allies.

Chinese Communist Party influence
According to a 2013 report by the US government-funded Center for International Media Assistance, "The Long Shadow of Chinese Censorship: How the Communist Party’s Media Restrictions Affect News Outlets Around the World," a number of patterns emerged in recent decades that signalled Sing Tao was under influence or directly controlled by the Chinese Communist Party: management and owners began practicing “self-censorship”, “high-risk” contributors were being terminated, and high turnover rates increased as journalists left due to an “unpalatable editorial policy.”

Editorial coverage also shifted noticeably since the 1990s, notes the report: 
 Avoiding or limiting coverage of politically sensitive topics such as 1989 military crackdown on Tiananmen Square protesters, Tibet, and Taiwanese independence.
 Shifting critical opinions from front to back pages.
 Choosing “politically correct” rhetoric.
 Reducing investigative journalism in favor of soft news or a simple accounting of emerging events.

A 2001 report on Chinese media censorship by the Jamestown Foundation cited Sing Tao as one of four major overseas Chinese newspapers directly or indirectly controlled by Beijing. “Four major Chinese newspapers are found in the U.S.—World Journal, Sing Tao Daily, Ming Pao Daily News, and The China Press," reads the report, “Of these four, three are either directly or indirectly controlled by the government of Mainland China, while the fourth (run out of Taiwan) has recently begun bowing to pressure from the Beijing government.”

The point of view on the influence of Chinese Communist Party was also stated by another author John Manthorpe in his book Claws of the Panda.

See also
 Headline Daily
 Newspapers of Hong Kong
 Media in Hong Kong
 Newspaper Society of Hong Kong
 Hong Kong Audit Bureau of Circulations
 The Standard (Hong Kong)
 Sing Tao Daily (Canada)

References

External links

Chinese-language newspapers published in Hong Kong
Chinese-language newspapers (Traditional Chinese)
Chinese-American culture in New York City
Chinese-language newspapers published in the United States
Daily newspapers published in New York City
Non-English-language newspapers published in New York (state)
Aw family
Sing Tao News Corporation